Miren Uxue Barkos Berruezo (born 5 July 1964 in Pamplona), simply known as Uxue Barkos, is a Spanish journalist and politician who served as the President of Navarre from 2015 to 2019. She previously represented the Basque coalition Geroa Bai (Basque for Yes to the Future), and before that, Nafarroa Bai (Basque For Yes to Navarre), in the Spanish Congress of Deputies.

Career in journalism 

Barkos graduated in Information Sciences at the University of Navarra. She worked as a newsreader on Spanish National Radio (Radio Nacional de España) and for Televisión Española, the state run television stations. She also worked for the newspaper Navarra Hoy and from 1990 onwards she worked for the main Basque broadcaster Euskal Telebista as newsreader and Madrid correspondent.

Congress of Deputies 

In 2004, in order to maximise the Basque vote, the individual parties Aralar, Eusko Alkartasuna (Basque Solidarity), Batzarre and the Basque Nationalist Party agreed to form the coalition Yes to Navarre (Nafarroa Bai) to contest the Navarre constituency, an area where Basque nationalism had historically been weakest. Barkos, who was not a member of any of the parties, was selected to head the list at the 2004 Spanish General Election. The list polled 17.98%, which represented the highest vote share for any Basque list in the constituency since democracy was restored in 1977. In Congress she worked to promote Basque language and culture in Navarre, although she was criticised by Batasuna, which was not part of the NB coalition. In Congress she was also a member of the Commission which investigated the 2004 Madrid train bombings.

At the 2008 Spanish General Election, Barkos retained her seat with a slightly better result (18.53%).

In 2011, Barkos and independents affiliated with the Yes to Navarre coalition founded new political group Zabaltzen under her leadership, in order to strengthen the coalition after Batzarre and Eusko Alkartasuna left, and Aralar decided to join Amaiur. Aralar prevented the rest of members from continuing to use Nafarroa Bai as a name; Zabaltzen, the Basque Nationalist Party and the newly incorporated Atarrabia Taldea contested the 2011 Spanish General Election as Geroa Bai (Yes to the Future). Barkos retained her seat polling 12,84%.

Pamplona City Council 
Barkos was Nafarroa Bai's candidate for Mayor of Pamplona at the 2007 local elections, obtaining 28.851 votes (26.26%) and 8 city councillors out of 27. Yolanda Barcina from Navarrese People's Union was invested mayor by the City Council.

Barkos acted as Nafarroa Bai's spokesperson in the City Council; in 2008, it was her turn to set the chupinazo off to mark the beginning of the popular San Fermín festival. In the 2011 local elections, Barkos retained her seat as councillor and her position as Nafarroa Bai's spokesperson; Enrique Maya from Navarrese People's Union was invested mayor by the City Council.

President of Navarre 
In September 2015, she was announced as Geroa Bai's candidate for President of Navarre. After the 2015 regional election, she was invested President of Navarre on 20 June 2015 thanks to the support of the regional parliament members of Geroa Bai (9), EH Bildu (8), Podemos (7) and Izquierda-Ezkerra (2), gaining the necessary majority (26 out of 50).

References

External links
Uxue Barkos' official website
Interview in Diario de Noticias, March 2008
TV interview, January 2006
 Uxue Barkos Quiz at LetsQuiz

1964 births
21st-century Spanish women politicians
Geroa Bai politicians
Living people
Members of the 8th Congress of Deputies (Spain)
Members of the 9th Congress of Deputies (Spain)
Members of the 10th Congress of Deputies (Spain)
Members of the 9th Parliament of Navarre
Members of the 10th Parliament of Navarre
Nafarroa Bai politicians
Politicians from Navarre
People from Pamplona
Presidents of the Government of Navarre
Municipal councillors in Navarre
Spanish television journalists
University of Navarra alumni
Women members of the Congress of Deputies (Spain)
Women members of the Parliament of Navarre
Women television journalists
Women presidents of the autonomous communities of Spain